Mount Bronk is a snow-covered mountain in the Hughes Range, a mountain range located in south-central Antarctica.

Mount Bronk was discovered and photographed by R. Admiral Byrd on the baselaying flight of November 18, 1929. From 1957 to 1958, it was surveyed by A.P. Crary who named the mount after Detlev W. Bronk, then-president of the U.S. National Academy of Sciences which helped sponsor Antarctic exploratory operations from 1957 to 1958.

References

Mountains of the Ross Dependency
Dufek Coast